Christopher Richardson may refer to:

 Christopher Richardson (Deputy Lieutenant) (1752–1825), justice of the peace
 Christopher Richardson (theatre founder)
 Christopher Richardson (figure skater)
 Chris Richardson (born 1984), American singer-songwriter
 Chris Richardson (basketball) (1980–2008), American basketball player